The Eramosa is a Silurian stratigraphic unit exposed along the Niagara Escarpment in Ontario and western New York State.  In the late nineteenth century it was an important source of building stone in Hamilton, Ancaster and Waterdown, and in the late twentieth century quarries in a similar unit, also called the Eramosa, near Wiarton in the Bruce Peninsula, became an important source of dimension stone at a time when most of the other resources of similar stone were depleted.  Work in these quarries led to the discovery of exceptionally well preserved fossils (the Eramosa lagerstätte).  On the east Mountain at Hamilton, a well-developed cave system was discovered in the Eramosa and has now been designated as the Eramosa Karst Conservation Area.

Stratigraphy
The term was first used for a stratigraphic unit by Williams (1915) who named the Eramosa Member (of the Lockport Formation) for the bituminous dolomites exposed below the Guelph Formation along the Eramosa River, northeast of Guelph, Ontario.  No detailed description of the type section has ever been published, and the status of the unit has been subject to many different interpretations.  Until recently, the Eramosa in Ontario was regarded as the highest Member of the Lockport Formation, with gradational contacts with the Goat Island Member (below) and the Guelph Formation (above).  In 1995, the US Geological Survey proposed a revised stratigraphy based on studies in the Niagara region.  It extended the Lockport to Group status and included, from base to top, the Gasport, Goat Island, Eramosa, and Guelph as Formations within the Lockport Group.  In a "reference section" in the Niagara River Gorge, the Eramosa was divided into six "units" recognized throughout the Niagara region, but a shaley lower unit previously named for the Hamilton area (the Vinemount Member) was transferred to the Goat Island Formation.  Brunton (2009) has proposed a revision for Ontario which restores the Vinemount Member to the Eramosa and recognizes two other members.

Age
The exact age and correlation of the Eramosa are still uncertain. Conodonts at first indicated that the Eramosa age was Ludlovian (c.420 Ma), but recent studies of both conodonts  and the Eramosa lagerstätte suggest an earlier,  late Wenlockian (c.425 Ma) age.

Paleoenvironment

The rocks forming the Eramosa are mostly dolomites, but the composition varies from almost pure, grey-weathering, fine-grained dolomite (at Ancaster) to shaley, bituminous, brown-weathering, bioturbated dolomites.  Fossils are common at some localities, scarce at others, and chert is generally a minor component.  The most characteristic feature is bituminous shaley interbeds.  Probably the Eramosa was deposited in several related environments, most likely including shallow, restricted (and poorly oxygenated) marine waters. Among the fossils, perhaps the most spectacular are the eurypterids, an extinct form of scorpions. Some species lived in fresh or brackish water, but Silurian examples were marine.

So-called "Eramosa marble" is actually a bituminous dolomite (see list.

References

Bancroft, A.M., M.A. Kleffner and F.R. Brunton, (2008).  Silurian conodont biostratigraphy and δ13 C stratigraphy of the Eramosa Formation, southwestern Ontario, Canada.  Geological Society of America Abstracts with Programs, v.40(5) p. 22.

Brett, C.E. et al., (1995). Revised Stratigraphy and Correlations of the Niagaran Provincial Series (Medina, Clinton and Lockport Groups) in the Type Area of Western New York.  U.S. Geological Survey Bulletin 2086, 66 p.

Brunton, F.R. (2009).  Update of revisions to Early Silurian stratigraphy of the Niagara Escarpment: Integration of sequence stratigraphy, sedimentology and hydrogeology to delineate hydrogeologic units.  Ontario Geological Survey Open File Report 6240, p. 25-1 to 25–20.

Collette, J.H. and D.M. Rudkin, (2010). Phyllocarid crustaceans from the Silurian Eramosa Lagerstätte (Ontario, Canada): Taxonomy and functional morphology.  Journal of Paleontology, v.58(1) p. 116-127.

Johnson, M. D., et al. (1991). Phanerozoic  Geology of Ontario; in Geology of Ontario, Ontario Geological Society Special Volume 4, pt. 1, p. 907-1008.

Von Bitter, P.H et al., (2007). Eramosa Lagerstätte – Exceptionally preserved soft-bodied biotas with shallow-marine shelly and bioturbating organisms (Silurian, Ontario, Canada). Geology, v.35(10) p. 879-883.

Williams, M.Y. (1915). A eurypterid horizon in the Niagara Formation of Ontario. Geological Survey of Canada Museum Bulletin 20, 21 p.

See also
List of types of limestone

Geology of Ontario